Game & Watch Gallery is a game developed by Nintendo and released in 1997 for the Game Boy. It is the second game in the Game & Watch Gallery series, after Game Boy Gallery. This game is the only game in the Game & Watch Gallery series to have its own soundtrack. The soundtrack also included updated versions of the music featured in the game.

A sequel, Game & Watch Gallery 2, was released for the Game Boy in 1997 and for the Game Boy Color in 1998.

Gameplay
Game & Watch Gallery features the following four games:

 Manhole: Mario, Toad and Donkey Kong Jr. are continuously walking across a platform. Players control Yoshi and must maneuver him in order to hold a manhole up to various gaps in the platform so that the characters do not fall. It was later included in Game & Watch Gallery 4.
 Oil Panic: Mario must catch leaking oil with a bucket, then dump it out the window to Yoshi before it overflows.
 Octopus: Mario dives for treasure to give to Peach but must avoid an octopus' moving tentacles. It was later included in Game & Watch Gallery 4.
 Fire: Peach's castle is burning and Toad, Yoshi and Donkey Kong Jr. are continuously leaping out to escape. Players control Mario and Luigi, who hold a tarp and must bounce their friends to safety. It was later included in Game & Watch Gallery 3 and 4.

Players can also choose to play these games in their original form, playing as the character who eventually became known as Mr. Game & Watch in Super Smash Bros. Melee. There are some slight differences between the classic and modern versions and in the former the games are composed of simple pixel graphics rather than detailed sprites. When played on a Super Game Boy or Game Boy Color, it receives a limited color upgrade. For every 200 points players accrue in each game, they earn 'stars' which can be used to unlock entries in an in-game gallery displaying animations of other Game & Watch titles; up to five stars can be earned in each mode and difficulty of each game, for a total of 80 stars.

Development
Game & Watch Gallery was designed by TOSE and Nintendo R&D1 and published by Nintendo. It was released for the Game Boy in Japan on February 1, 1997, in the United States on May 5, 1997, in Europe on August 28, 1997, and in Australia in 1997; it was released for the Nintendo Power for the Game Boy in Japan on March 1, 2000. It was released on the Nintendo 3DS Virtual Console in Japan on June 22, 2011, in North America on July 14, 2011, and in Europe and Australia on July 21, 2011; while it was originally released under the title Game Boy Gallery 2 in Australia, the Virtual Console release uses the title Game & Watch Gallery.

Reception

Game & Watch Gallery holds an average of 76.65% on GameRankings, based on four reviews. Steve Averett for IGN held it in high regard, comparing it to Tetris and Dr. Mario in terms of being a quality "twitch" game. They note it as a good game for fan of Game & Watch games, while it was recognized as IGNs readers' choice for the "best Game Boy action game" of the century. Nathan Meunier of GamesRadar+ found the game addictive while praising it for the updated Game & Watch games. However, they found the original versions less fun, and wished more games were featured on the cartridge. Jeremy Parish for USgamer identified it as one of the best Game Boy games on the Nintendo 3DS' Virtual Console, while Thomas East of Official Nintendo Magazine UK felt it was among the best retro games on the 3DS' Virtual Console. East found the games basic, but addictive nonetheless. Clark Anderson of Digitally Downloaded found the Virtual Console re-release a good value, praising the different games (particularly Fire) as addictive. Andrew Brown of Nintendo World Report felt that the game offered something for all types of players, due to the combination of the classic games and the remade games. However, Kristan Reed of Eurogamer felt that those who lack nostalgia for this game or Game & Watch games in general would not enjoy this much, calling it "little more than a curiosity." Tyler Treese of Game Revolution expressed hope that Game & Watch Gallery, along with its sequels, was remade for the Nintendo Switch. Author James Newman discussed how it served as a precursor to the trend of remastering games that grew popular on the PlayStation 3 and Xbox 360, citing how the game enhances the visuals of the remastered versions while keeping the gameplay the same.

References

External links

Game Boy games
Nintendo Research & Development 1 games
1997 video games
Video game remakes
Nintendo video game compilations
Video games developed in Japan
Virtual Console games for Nintendo 3DS
Game & Watch
Tose (company) games